Gado Gado is an Asian restaurant in Portland, Oregon.

Description
The restaurant serves Indonesian and Chinese cuisine in Portland's Hollywood neighborhood; the menu includes pork-and-blood-sausage corn dogs, noodle and rice dishes (including nasi goreng with Chinese sausage and Dungeness crab), and salads, including a banana-leaf-smoked duck salad with citrus, lime leaf, and basil.

Gado Gado has been described as a "casual, colorful restaurant, tucked in a nondescript strip mall".

History
Thomas Pisha-Duffly and Mariah Pisha-Duffly opened Gado Gado in June 2019, slightly later than initially planned. The restaurant began serving brunch in July. Following a two-week closure because of the COVID-19 pandemic, in April 2020 the Pisha-Dufflys launch a menu of "stoner food" called "Oma's Takeaway"; the pop-up, later renamed Oma's Hideaway, became a standalone restaurant in 2020.

Reception
In 2019, Gado Gado was a Restaurant of the Year finalist in Eater Portland Eater Awards. Daniel Barnett included the restaurant in a 2020 list of "Portland's 10 Buzziest New Breakfasts and Brunches". Gado Gado was nominated in the Best New Restaurant category at the 2020 James Beard Awards.

In 2020, the restaurant was included in the Eater Portland lists "Portland's Top Pandan Treats" and "15 Delectable Dumpling Destinations in Portland". Brooke Jackson-Glidden also included Gado Gado in Eater Portland 2021 list of "The 38 Essential Restaurants and Food Carts in Portland". The website's Nathan Williams included the restaurant in a 2022 list of "14 Standout Spots in Portland’s Eclectic Hollywood District".

See also

 List of Chinese restaurants

References

External links

 

2019 establishments in Oregon
Chinese restaurants in Portland, Oregon
Hollywood, Portland, Oregon
Indonesian American
Indonesian restaurants
Restaurants established in 2019